"Thank You for the Venom" is the second single and ninth track from My Chemical Romance's second studio album, Three Cheers for Sweet Revenge. It was released as an airplay single in Europe. It is also My Chemical Romance's fifth single. The song peaked at number 71 in the UK. The song was released in limited edition red vinyl and has long been out of print. It was featured in Need for Speed: Underground Rivals for PSP.

The opening line "Sister I'm not much a poet/but a criminal" is a reference to the Morrissey song "Sister I'm a Poet". The vinyl version contains a live cover of "Jack the Ripper", also originally by Morrissey.

Track listings
All songs written by My Chemical Romance, except where noted.

Charts

Release history

References

My Chemical Romance songs
2004 singles
Songs written by Gerard Way
Song recordings produced by Howard Benson
2004 songs
Reprise Records singles